Live (X Cert) is the first live album by the Stranglers, released in February 1979 by United Artists. It contains tracks recorded at The Roundhouse in June and November 1977 and at Battersea Park in September 1978.

It captures the raw punk sound of the band prior to the more experimental music of their fourth album, 1979's The Raven. It also contains some amusing between-song audience baiting and provides a fairly accurate picture of the Stranglers' live sound during this period.

CD reissues were augmented with extra live tracks recorded at The Nashville, West Kensington in 1976, and The Hope and Anchor, Islington in 1977.

The album spent ten weeks on the UK Albums Chart, peaking at No. 7. It was the band's fourth album release, and their fourth consecutive UK top ten album.

Critical reception

The album received a mixed reception at the time of release. Nick Kent of the NME remarked that those who have the band's first three studio albums "don't need inferior versions of the same," while Ronnie Gurr, reviewing the album for the same magazine, said, "Played alongside the studio tracks, the quality, power and gut ... shines through and leaves Rattus Norvegicus, No More Heroes and Black and White as mere cut-outs in the deletion bin of life." 

Retrospectively, Ira Robbins of Trouser Press wrote that the "high-tension ambience" and Hugh Cornwell's audience banter "make it an effective dual-function live/greatest hits album." John Dougan, writing for AllMusic, wrote, "Live (X Cert) is worthy if only to hear Hugh Cornwell bait and insult the audience (very punk!). Plus the band sounds pretty good, loads of aggression and volume add to the fun. Not essential but a very interesting snapshot of an era."

Track listing

 Track 12 from The Nashville, London, 10 December 1976. Originally included on a free 7" with the Rattus Norvegicus album.
 Track 13 from Hope and Anchor, London, 22 November 1977. Originally included on the "Don't Bring Harry" EP in 1979.
 Tracks 14-18 are taken from the same era as the original source tapes. 

2018 CD reissue bonus tracks (Parlophone)

 Tracks 12-19 are from the shows used for Live (X-Cert) and are previously unreleased.

Personnel
Credits adapted from the album liner notes.

The Stranglers
 Hugh Cornwell – guitar, vocals
 Jean-Jacques Burnel – bass, vocals
 Dave Greenfield – keyboards, vocals
 Jet Black – drums
Technical
Martin Rushent – producer, mixing
Alan Winstanley – engineer
Doug Bennett – engineer
Laurence Diana – engineer
Mick McKenna – engineer
George Peckham – mastering
John Pasche – art direction, design
Kevin Sparrow – logo
Terry Kemble – model making
Phil Jude – outer sleeve photography
Trevor Rogers – inner sleeve photography 
Hiro Ohno – inner sleeve photography

References

1979 live albums
The Stranglers live albums
Albums produced by Martin Rushent
United Artists Records live albums